The State University of New York at Binghamton (Binghamton University or SUNY Binghamton) is a public research university with campuses in Binghamton, Vestal, and Johnson City, New York.  It is one of the four university centers in the State University of New York (SUNY) system. As of Fall 2020, 18,128 undergraduate and graduate students attended the university.

Since its establishment in 1946, the school has evolved from a small liberal arts college to a large research university. It is classified among "R1: Doctoral Universities – Very high research activity".

Binghamton's athletic teams are the Bearcats and they compete in Division I of the National Collegiate Athletic Association (NCAA).  The Bearcats are members of the America East Conference.

History

Establishment

Binghamton University was established in 1946 in Endicott, New York, as Triple Cities College to serve the needs of local veterans returning from World War II. Thomas J. Watson, a founding member of IBM in Broome County, viewed the Triple Cities region as an area of great potential. In the early 1940s he collaborated with local leaders to begin establishing Triple Cities College as a two-year junior college operating as a satellite of private Syracuse University. Watson also donated land that would become the school's early home.

Originally, Triple Cities College students finished their bachelor's degrees at Syracuse. By the 1948–1949 academic year, the degrees could be completed entirely in Binghamton. In 1950, it split from Syracuse and became incorporated into the public State University of New York (SUNY) system as Harpur College, named in honor of Robert Harpur, a colonial teacher and pioneer who settled in the Binghamton area. At that time, Harpur and Champlain College in Plattsburgh were the only two liberal arts schools in the New York state system. When Champlain closed in 1952 to make way for the Plattsburgh Air Force Base, the records and some students and faculty were transferred to Harpur College in Binghamton. Harpur also received 16,000 non-duplicate volumes and the complete contents of the Champlain College library.

In 1955, Harpur began to plan its current location in Vestal, a town next to Binghamton. A site large enough to anticipate future growth was purchased, with the school's move to its new  campus being completed by 1961. Colonial Hall, Triple Cities College's original building in Endicott, stands today as the village's Visitor's Center.

In 1965, Harpur College was selected to join New York state schools at Stony Brook University, Albany, and Buffalo as one of the four new SUNY university centers. Redesignated the State University of New York at Binghamton, the school's new name reflected its status as an advanced degree granting institution. In a nod to tradition, its undergraduate college of arts and sciences remained "Harpur College". With more than 60% of undergraduate and graduate students enrolled in Harpur's degree programs, it is the largest of Binghamton's constituent schools. In 1967, the School of Advanced Technology was established, the precursor to the Thomas J. Watson School of Engineering and Applied Science, which was founded in 1983. In 2020, the school became the Thomas J. Watson College of Engineering and Applied Science.

Since 1992, the school has made an effort to distinguish itself from the SUNY system, rebranding itself as "Binghamton University," or "Binghamton University, State University of New York". Both names are accepted as first reference in news stories. While the school's legal and official name, the State University of New York at Binghamton, still appears on official documents such as diplomas, the administration discourages using the full name unless absolutely necessary. It also discourages references to the school as "SUNY—Binghamton," "SUNY—B," or "Harpur College".

Presidents
The first president of Harpur College, who began as dean of Triple Cities College, was Glenn Bartle. The second president, George Bruce Dearing, served several years before leaving to become vice chancellor for academic affairs at the SUNY Central Administration in Albany. Next was C. Peter Magrath, former interim president of the University of Nebraska, who served from 1972 to 1974 then left to become president at the University of Minnesota.

The fourth president at Binghamton was Clifford D. Clark, who left his position as dean of the business school at the University of Kansas to serve as vice president for academic affairs at Binghamton in 1973. He was asked to take on the job of acting president in the fall of 1974, when Magrath left for Minnesota. Clark was selected as president and served from March 1975 through mid-1990. He led the school's evolution from primarily a four-year liberal arts college to a research university. Clark added the Anderson Center for the Performing Arts and inaugurated the Summer Music Festival, created the Harpur Forum (now called the Binghamton University Forum), established the Thomas J. Watson School of Engineering and Applied Science, and fostered the expansion and development of the Decker School of Nursing.

Lois B. DeFleur became the university's fifth president upon Clark's retirement in 1990. During her nearly 20-year tenure the university experienced its most significant growth. She oversaw substantial additions to the student and faculty populations, vastly expanded research activities and funding, formalized Binghamton's fundraising efforts, expanded the campus' physical footprint by approximately 20 buildings, launched Binghamton's "green" efforts for which they are now nationally recognized, transitioned the school from Division III athletics to Division I and catalyzed the biggest increase in academic rankings to date. DeFleur retired in 2010 and on July 1, Magrath returned as interim president.

On November 22, 2011, the SUNY Board of Trustees appointed Harvey G. Stenger, Jr. as the seventh president of Binghamton University, effective January 1, 2012. Stenger had been interim provost and executive vice president for academic affairs at the University at Buffalo since April 2011.

Organization

University leadership
Binghamton is one of four university centers of the State University of New York (SUNY) system and is governed by its board of trustees. The Binghamton University Council oversees such aspects of the school's governance as student conduct, budget and physical facilities. Nine of its ten members are appointed by the state governor, one elected by the student body.

The university is organized into six administrative offices: Academic Affairs; Advancement; Diversity, Equity and Inclusion; Operations; Research; and Student Affairs. The Division of Diversity, Equity and Inclusion is managed by a chief diversity officer and the other divisions are managed by a vice president.

, the university had an endowment of $152.619 million, managed by the not-for-profit Binghamton University Foundation, which also oversees fundraising. Its most recent drive–'Bold.Brilliant.Binghamton—the Campaign for Binghamton University'– raised more than $100 million before ending on June 30, 2012, $5 million over its original goal.

Colleges and schools

Binghamton is composed of the following colleges and schools:
 Harpur College of Arts and Sciences is the oldest and largest of Binghamton's schools. It has more than 9,400 undergraduates and more than 1,100 graduate students in 26 departments and 14 interdisciplinary degree programs in the fine arts, humanities, natural and social sciences, and mathematics.
 The College of Community and Public Affairs offers an undergraduate major in human development as well as graduate programs in social work; public administration; student affairs administration; human rights; and teaching, learning and educational leadership. It was formed in July 2006, after a reorganization of its predecessor, the School of Education and Human Development, when it was split off along with the Graduate School of Education. In 2017, the Graduate School of Education merged back into the College of Community and Public Affairs as the Department of Teaching, Learning and Educational Leadership. The department continues to offer master's of science and doctoral degrees.
 The Decker College of Nursing and Health Sciences was established in 1969. The school offers undergraduate, master's and doctoral degrees in nursing. The school is accredited by the Commission of Collegiate Nursing Education (CCNE).
 The School of Management was established in 1970. It offers bachelor's, master's and doctoral degrees in management, finance, information science, marketing, accounting, and operations and business analytics. It is accredited by the American Assembly of Collegiate Schools of Business (AACSB).
 The Thomas J. Watson College of Engineering and Applied Science offers undergraduate and graduate degrees in mechanical engineering, electrical engineering, computer engineering, biomedical engineering, systems science and industrial engineering, materials science and engineering, and computer science. All of the school's departments have been accredited by the Accreditation Board for Engineering and Technology.
The Graduate School administers advanced-degree programs and awards degrees through the seven component colleges above. Graduate students will find almost 70 areas of study. Undergraduate and graduate students are taught and advised by a single faculty.
The School of Pharmacy and Pharmaceutical Sciences, the newest school at Binghamton, and offers doctoral degrees in pharmacy and pharmacology. The school has been granted Candidate status from the Accreditation Council for Pharmacy Education, which grants all the rights and privileges available to students of accredited schools, and anticipates full accreditation upon graduation of its inaugural class in 2021. The school enrolled its first students in fall 2017, and in 2018 opened its state-of-the-art, $60 million new building on a new Health Sciences Campus in Johnson City, near UHS-Wilson Medical Center.

Campuses

Main Campus 
The campus is shaped like a brain: the primary road on campus creates a closed loop to form the cerebrum and cerebellum, and the main entrance road creates the spinal cord which leads up to a traffic circle (representing the medulla). The main road is thus frequently referred to as The Brain. The connector road, which goes behind the Mountainview and College-in-the-Woods residential communities, is closed for a portion of the year (in late fall and early spring, to allow for safe migration of salamanders across the road). The campus features a  Nature Preserve, which contains forest and wetland areas and includes a six-acre (24,000 m2) pond, named Harpur Pond, that adjoins the campus. The Nature Preserve drains into Fuller Hollow Creek, which runs parallel along the eastern portion of the campus. Fuller Hollow Creek meanders north after leaving campus, where it soon empties into the Susquehanna River.

Health Sciences Campus 

Binghamton's nearly 15-acre new Health Sciences Campus is located in Johnson City, NY. The campus is located a block from Main St. and is in close proximity to UHS Wilson Medical Center and Ascension Lourdes Hospital. The School of Pharmacy building opened in 2018, while the first floor floors Decker College of Nursing and Health Sciences building opened in January 2021. The construction of floors five and six are expected to be completed during the summer of 2021. A Research and Development facility is in the design phase and will be constructed immediately adjacent to the pharmacy school; it is slated to be completed by December 2022. The university also plans on developing a park on two acres of land between Corliss Avenue and Main Street, which will offer an attractive and safe connection between university facilities and the downtown business district.

Downtown Center 

The University Downtown Center (UDC), located near the confluence of the Susquehanna and Chenango Rivers, opened in 2007 and houses the College of Community and Public Affairs (CCPA). In 2011, the Downtown Center was severely damaged from flooding caused by Tropical Storm Lee. While only the lowest floor of the building was filled with water, the electric company was unable to shut the power off in time, resulting in the building's electrical system being ruined. Classes were moved to the Main campus until repairs were completed. Repairs took a year to complete, and the UDC reopened for the start of the fall 2012 semester. In 2017, the university received $2.7 million for the flood repairs.

Facilities

Libraries
 The Glenn G. Bartle Library, named after the university's first president, contains collections in the humanities, social sciences, government documents and collections in mathematical and computer sciences. Additionally, Bartle Library houses the Fine Arts Collection (focusing on works relating to art, music, theater and cinema) and Special Collections (containing the Max Reinhardt Collection, as well as the Edwin A. Link and Marion Clayton Link Archives).
The Science Library contains materials in all science and engineering disciplines, as well as a map collection.
The University Downtown Center (UDC) Library and Information Commons supports the departments of social work, human development, public administration, and student affairs administration.
The libraries offer a number of services including research consultation and assistance, a laptop lending program, customized instruction sessions and three information commons in the Bartle, Science and UDC libraries. The libraries offer access to various online databases to facilitate research for students and faculty. The entire campus is also served by a wireless internet network that all students, staff and faculty have access to, funded in part by mandatory student technology fees. The computing services center supports Windows, Macintosh and Unix systems, both in public computer labs and for students' personal computers.

Anderson Center for the Performing Arts

This theater complex has three stages: Watters Theater, seating 550; the Chamber Hall, seating 450; and the Osterhout Concert Theater, seating 1,200. The concert theater has the ability to become an open-air venue, with its movable, floor-to-ceiling glass windows that open up to a grassy hill. The Anderson Center has hosted performers such as the Russian Symphony and Ballet, the Prague National Symphony and the Shakespearian Theater Company. In March 2006, an overflow house, filling all of the Anderson Center's theaters, was present to hear guest speaker Noam Chomsky.

University Art Museum

The university's art collection is housed at more than one location, but all within the Fine Arts Building. The building's main-level gallery hosts various artifacts which belong to the Permanent Collection, though typically showcases student work on a rotating basis. The Permanent Collection in the basement level of the building displays ancient art from Egypt, China and other locales. Lastly, the Elsie B. Rosefsky Gallery, just off the Grand Corridor, presents special exhibits and portfolios.

University Union
The University Union is divided into two sections, sometimes referred to as the old Union and the new Union, sometimes referred to as Union East and West respectively, yet called "University Union (UU)" and "University Union West (UUW)" by the university itself. The Union houses many student organizations, a food co-op, The MarketPlace food court, a number of meeting spaces, many new classrooms, the University Bookstore and a branch of Visions Federal Credit Union.

On August 23, 2013, President Barack Obama hosted a town hall meeting in the University Union to discuss college affordability with students, faculty, and staff at Binghamton University.

Events Center

The Events Center is one of the area's largest venue for athletics, concerts, fairs and more. Home court to the Binghamton Bearcats basketball teams, the facility seats about 5,300 people for games. For concerts, Commencement and other larger events, the Events Center can hold up to 8,000 people. Home site for the America East Conference Men's Basketball Championships in 2005, 2006, and 2008, the court hosted the women's championships in 2007 and 2015. It's also held intercollegiate indoor track meets, tennis matches and wrestling matches, as well as opening and closing ceremonies for the Empire State Games. Its construction cost $33.1M and it opened in 2004.

Other athletic facilities
In addition to the Events Center, the north end of campus houses the East and West Gyms, which host student recreation and varsity athletics programs. The East Gym underwent a major renovation, completed in winter 2012, and is now called the Recreational Center at the East Gym, and includes the 10,000-sq. ft. FitSpace fitness facility, three new multipurpose rooms, improved pool and court spaces, a new wellness services suite and completely renovated locker rooms. Other varsity facilities include baseball and softball fields, the Bearcats Sports Complex (a soccer and lacrosse stadium) and an outdoor track. With a gift from an anonymous donor, the baseball fields underwent a $2 million facelift including the addition of artificial turf and lights in 2016. Other student recreation features are a series of playing fields used for soccer, football, rugby and ultimate frisbee.

Science Complex

The science complex includes five instructional and office buildings, as well as a four-climate teaching greenhouse and the Science Library. Buildings are named sequentially as Science 1 through 5. They contain faculty offices and classrooms for the biological sciences, anthropology, geological sciences and psychology departments.

Academic Complex
The Academic Complex is a two-building complex that opened in 1999. Academic A houses the School of Management. Academic B houses the Decker School of Nursing.

Innovative Technologies Complex
More commonly known as the ITC, the Innovative Technologies Complex is a new development intended to advance venture capital research in both the support of the university's activities and that of the local high-technology industry. Currently the complex includes four buildings: the Biotechnology Building, formerly belonging to NYSEG and now extensively renovated; the Engineering and Science Building, opened in 2011; the Center of Excellence Building, which houses the Small Scale Systems Integration and Packaging Center, a New York State Center of Excellence, opened in 2014; and the Smart Energy Building that houses the chemistry and physics departments, opened in 2017. Early talks indicated plans for a six-building complex at its completion.

Nature Preserve

Students have actively worked to make sure the space remains untouched. The preserve features approximately 10 miles(16 km) of maintained paths, a six-acre pond, marsh areas, vernal pools, tall hills and a hill-top meadow. A popular hang-out spot is the long wooden boardwalk constructed across one of the marshes, overlooking the lake. There is continued discussion about management of the rapidly growing deer population in the preserve.

Residential communities

Residence halls at Binghamton are grouped into seven communities. The apartment communities used to house graduate students, but now house undergraduates. Of the residential colleges, Dickinson Community and Newing College are the newest. Dickinson features "flats" of either four single rooms or two double rooms and a single, while Newing features semi-private room styles sharing private bathrooms as well as some common bathrooms. College-in-the-Woods mixes suites and double- and triple-occupancy rooms, and Hinman College and Mountainview College consist of suites, exclusively. Susquehanna Community and Hillside Community contain only apartments.

The newly completed Newing College, opened in fall 2011, and Dickinson Community, completed in 2013, are part of the university's $375 million East Campus Housing project, which also included a new collegiate center and dining facility. The old Newing community was razed to make room for the new communities. The old Dickinson community was renovated and repurposed for academics, offices and departments. The last of the new Newing and Dickinson residence halls were unveiled in 2013.
 Dickinson Community: Named for Daniel S. Dickinson, a mid-19th century U.S. Senator from surrounding area, important as the "Defender of the Constitution" in pre-Civil War era. Buildings are named after other prominent local figures, including founders of the university. The buildings of this community were replaced with a new state-of-the-art living community completed in the fall of 2013.
 Hinman College: Named for New York State Senator Harvey D. Hinman. Buildings are named after former New York State governors, and were constructed between 1967 and 1968.
 Newing College: Named for Stuart Newing, a local automobile dealer who was active in the effort to have SUNY purchase Triple Cities College. Buildings are named for Southern Tier towns and counties. Newing College was rebuilt completely, and the new residence halls and student center/dining hall opened in fall 2011. The remaining older Newing buildings were demolished to make room for the new Dickinson Community, which opened in the fall of 2013.
 College-in-the-Woods: Named for its location in a wooded area of the campus. Buildings are named after tribes of the Iroquois Confederacy. College-in-the-Woods opened for residency in the fall of 1973.
 Mountainview College: The four individual residential halls—Cascade, Hunter, Marcy, and Windham—were named after peaks in the Adirondack and Catskill Mountains and each house up to 300 students. Mountainview was completed between 2003 and 2004.
 Susquehanna Community: Buildings are named for tributaries of the Susquehanna River, which flows through the city of Binghamton.
 Hillside Community: Named for its location at the highest part of the Binghamton campus. Halls are named for New York state parks. The 16 apartment buildings are ordered in alphabetical order clockwise.

Transportation
 Bus transportation on campus and in local neighborhoods with a high density of students is provided by the student-owned and operated Off Campus College Transport (OCCT). OCCT is entirely student run and is free for all students; it is supported by the mandatory student activity and transportation fees and by funds and resources provided by the university. OCCT is managed by the Student Association.
 Students, faculty and staff are able to ride the Broome County Transit bus system for free, paid for through a portion of the transportation fee.
 The ESCAPE Student Bus Service, operated by the Student Association, provides coach transportation to students between the Vestal campus and the New York metropolitan area on weekends and on university breaks.

Academics

Rankings and reputation
 Binghamton is ranked tied for 83rd among national universities, tied for 33rd among public schools, ranked as the second-best SUNY school (after Stony Brook University, ranked 77th), and tied for 874th among global universities for 2022 by U.S. News & World Report.
 In 2021, Forbes magazine rated Binghamton No. 77 out of the 600 best private and public colleges, universities and service academies in America.
 Money magazine ranked Binghamton 73rd in the country out of 739 schools evaluated for its 2020 "Best Colleges for Your Money" edition, and 48th in its list of the 50 best public schools in the U.S.
 The university is ranked 653rd in the world, 162nd in the nation in the 2021-22 Center for University World Rankings.
 Binghamton University is ranked the 18th best public college in the U.S. by The Business Journals in 2015.
 In 2016 Binghamton was ranked as the 10th best public college in the United States by Business Insider.
 In 2018, the university was ranked 401-500 by Times Higher Education World Ranking.
 In its inaugural college rankings, based upon "... the economic value of a university...," The Economist ranked Binghamton University 74th overall in the nation.
 The university was called a Public Ivy by Howard and Matthew Greene in a book titled The Public Ivies: America's Flagship Public Universities (2001).  It was a runner-up for the original Public Ivy list in 1985.
 Binghamton was ranked 93rd in the 2020 National Universities category of the Washington Monthly college rankings in the U.S., based on its contribution to the public good, as measured by social mobility, research, and promoting public service.
 According to the 2014 BusinessWeek rankings, the undergraduate business school was ranked 57th among Public Schools in the nation. In 2010 it was ranked as having the second best accounting program.
 Binghamton's QS World University Rankings have decreased annually from 501 in 2008, to 601 in 2012 and 701+ in 2013 with higher numbers reflecting worse performance.

Admissions and finance
Binghamton University is one of the most selective schools in the SUNY system. In 2020, the university received more than 42,000 applications.  In the Fall of 2020, the undergraduate acceptance rate was 40%.
 According to the latest data (Fall 2020), Binghamton University has the following records; median SAT scores: math 640–730, Evidence-based reading and writing 640–710; median ACT score: 29–33; Freshmen Retention Rate: 92% (National Avg. 62%); Median High School GPA: 3.7–3.9 or 93–98; Average Transfer GPA: 3.3-3.8.
 The average debt at graduation is $14,734, and the school is in the top 15 lowest debt-load amongst public colleges in the country.
 In-state tuition is $6,670 and out-of-state tuition is $21,550.

Student body
, there are 14,168 undergraduate students and 3,961 graduate students enrolled at Binghamton University, with 768 full-time faculty and a student-to-faculty of 19:1.  84% of undergraduate students at Binghamton are residents of New York state, with more than 60 percent from the greater New York City area and the remainder from all corners of the state. The remaining 16 percent of the undergraduate student body is made up of residents of other states in the U.S. (7.5 percent) and international students (8.5 percent) from around the world.  Since 1990, the university has experienced growth in enrollment (with a 1990 enrollment of 11,883). Since the arrival of President Harvey Stenger in 2012, the university had launched a plan to grow to 20,000 students by 2020, while adding faculty and staff to support the growth.

Curriculum
Binghamton offers more than 130 academic undergraduate majors, minors, certificates, concentrations, emphases, tracks and specializations and more than 60 master's, 30 doctorate and 50 accelerated (combined bachelor's/master's) degrees. There also exist interdisciplinary programs that allow individualized degree programs at both the undergraduate and graduate level.

The school offers several early assurance programs which guarantee acceptance to graduate/professional schools outside of Binghamton, such as the Norton College of Medicine at SUNY Upstate Medical University. BU and Upstate offer an Early Assurance Program (EAP) for pre-medical College Sophomores pursuing their M.D. degree. Students accepted into the program are required to finish their undergraduate education and maintain a 3.50 GPA to be guaranteed a seat at the medical school.

Binghamton is accredited by the Middle States Association of Colleges and Schools.

General education
The university requires students to have completed 12 general education requirements in order to graduate, with some exceptions depending on the school. These include courses in aesthetics, global inter-dependencies, humanities, laboratory science, composition and oral communication, mathematics, physical activity and wellness, social science and U.S. pluralism. Individual schools within the university have additional requirements. Students in Harpur College must complete a minimum of 126 credits to graduate. Most classes at Binghamton are worth four credits, rather than the more usual three. The typical undergraduate's course load thus consists of four courses (for 16 credits) rather than the usual five (for 15 credits).

Research
The university is designated as an advanced research institution, with a division of research, an independent research foundation, several research centers including a New York State Center of Excellence, and partnerships with other institutions.  Binghamton University was ranked 163rd nationally in research and development expenditures by the National Science Foundation.  In fiscal year 2013, the university had research expenditures of $76 million.

Division of research
The office of the vice president for research is in charge of the university's Division of Research.
The Office of Sponsored Programs supports the Binghamton University community in its efforts to seek and obtain external awards to support research, training, and other scholarly and creative activities. It provides support to faculty and staff in all aspects of proposal preparation, submission and grant administration.
The Office of Research Compliance ensures the protection of human subjects, the welfare of animals, safe use of select agents pathogens and toxins, and to enhance the ethical conduct in research programs.
The Office of Research Advancement facilitates the growth of research and scholarship, and helps build awareness of the work being done on campus.
The Office of Entrepreneurship and Innovation Partnerships supports entrepreneurship, commercialization of technologies, start-ups and business incubation, and facilitates partnerships with the community and industry.

SUNY Research Foundation
The Research Foundation for the State University of New York is a private, nonprofit educational corporation that administers externally funded contracts and grants for and on behalf of SUNY. The foundation carries out its responsibilities pursuant to a 1977 agreement with the university. It is separate from the university and does not receive services provided to New York State agencies or state appropriation to support corporate functions. Sponsored program functions delegated to the campuses are conducted under the supervision of foundation operations managers.  The Office of Sponsored Funds Administration, often referred to as "post-award administration," is the fiscal and operational office for the foundation. It provides sponsored project personnel with comprehensive financial, project accounting, human resources, procurement, accounts payable and reporting services, as well as support for projects administered through the Research Foundation.

Centers and institutes
33 organized research centers and institutes for advanced studies facilitate interdisciplinary and specialized research at the university.  The university is home to the New York State Center of Excellence in Small Scale Systems Integration and Packaging (S3IP).  S3IP conducts research in areas such as microelectronics manufacturing and packaging, data center energy management, and solar energy.  Other research centers and institutes include the Center for Development and Behavioural Neuroscience (CDBN), Center for Interdisciplinary Studies in Philosophy, Interpretation, and Culture (CPIC), Institute for Materials Research (IMR). The Fernand Braudel Center for the Study of Economies, Historical Systems, and Civilizations (FBC) closed on June 30, 2020.

Partnerships
The university's Office of Entrepreneurship and Innovation Partnerships can connect people to resources available through programs such as STARTUP NY, the Small Business Development Center, the region's Trade Adjustment Assistance Center, campus Start-Up Suites and the Koffman Southern Tier Incubator.

Student life

Greek life
Recognized fraternities and sororities at the university include:

Student organizations
Student organizations at Binghamton are organized and run through the Student Association at Binghamton University. The Student Association provides a number of services and entertainment for students, including bus transportation and the annual Spring Fling festival.  In 2013, the university and the Student Association collaborated to introduce B-Engaged, a website which features a complete list of all involvement opportunities at Binghamton.

The Student Association of Binghamton University, Inc. (SA) is the student union of undergraduate students at the university.  It is a 501-c3 non-for-profit organization that is autonomous from the university. It was first formed in 1978 and now represents and provides resources for over 13,000 undergraduate students, charters student groups, provides concerts and programming, and transportation services. Although it is run primarily by students, it has a small professional staff consisting of an assistant director and a finance director.

Notable student organization at the university include:

 WHRW: Student radio station founded in 1961
 Pipe Dream: Student newspaper founded in 1946 as The Colonial News
 Harpur's Ferry Student Volunteer Ambulance Service: EMS provider for the Binghamton University campus and all off-campus students. It was founded in 1973 and has twice been recognized as the No. 1 collegiate Emergency Medical Service agency in the nation.
 Explorchestra: University's composers' orchestra is dedicated to the promotion of new music by composers from diverse backgrounds
 Debate team: Consistently been ranked as one of the top ten debate programs in the nation by the Cross Examination Debate Association and ranked 1st in 2008

Athletics

Binghamton University's Intercollegiate Athletics program is an NCAA Division I program.
The Intercollegiate Athletics program comprises 21 sports that compete in the America East Conference for all sports except wrestling and golf. The 21 sports include Baseball, Men's & Women's Basketball, Men's & Women's Cross Country, Men's Golf, Men's & Women's Lacrosse, Men's & Women's Soccer, Softball, Men's & Women's Swimming & Diving, Men's & Women's Tennis, Men's & Women's Indoor Track, Men's & Women's Outdoor Track, Women's Volleyball and Men's Wrestling.

The school also hosts several intramural and inter-community sports.  Binghamton University, and more specifically Hinman College, is considered to be the creator of Co-Rec Football, a popular version of flag/touch football and is generally played amongst several teams within each dormitory community.

Binghamton athletics gained significant negative attention during the Binghamton University basketball scandal in 2010, when it was revealed that the school had compromised its integrity and committed internal violations in pursuit of athletic glory. The scandal left Binghamton's basketball team in ruin.

Alma mater
In the Rolling Hills of Binghamton is the official alma mater song of Binghamton University, composed by David Engel (class of 1986)

Notable people

Faculty

 Jessica Hua, biological sciences, Director for the Center for Integrated Watershed Studies
 Ken Jacobs, experimental filmmaker
 M. Stanley Whittingham, chemistry/materials science and engineering, recipient of the 2019 Nobel Prize in Chemistry
 David Sloan Wilson, biological sciences/anthropology
Al Walker (born 1959), former basketball player and college coach, now a scout for the Detroit Pistons of the NBA
 Larry Woiwode, author

Former faculty
 Ali Mazrui (1933—2014), author on African and Islamic studies and north–south relations
 Bruce McDuffie (1921—2014), Professor of Chemistry, found high levels of mercury in canned tuna in 1970.
 Immanuel Wallerstein (1930—2019), sociologist and economic historian best known for his development of world-systems theory.

Alumni

 Robyn Adele Anderson, 2011, founding member and primary vocalist for Postmodern Jukebox
 Morteza Aghatehrani, Iranian politician, cleric, scholar, mujtahid
 Peter Altabef, 1980, CEO of Unisys
 Billy Baldwin, 1985, actor
 David P. Barash, 1966, evolutionary biologist, Professor of Psychology at University of Washington and author of over 30 books
 Andrew Bergman, screenwriter, author and director
 Alan Berliner, 1982, Emmy award-winning documentary filmmaker
 Leland Bobbé, photographer
 Paul Bové, 1989, Professor of English, University of Pittsburgh
 Mark Mathew Braunstein, 1974, author
 Joseph Buttigieg, Ph.D. 1976, Professor of English, University of Notre Dame, father of United States Secretary of Transportation Pete Buttigieg
Lorrie Clemo, 15th president of D'Youville College
 Stephanie Courtney, 1992, actress, Flo (Progressive Insurance)
 Amy Dacey, 1993, CEO of the Democratic National Committee
 Scott Diamond Former MLB pitcher for the Minnesota Twins
 Grey J. Dimenna, President of Monmouth University
 Mary L. Droser, MS c.1980, paleontologist, professor of paleobiology at University of California, Riverside
 Ronald G. Ehrenberg, 1966, labor economist and author
 Nathan Englander, 1992, author
 Michael J. Epstein, 1998, filmmaker, musician, and writer
 Faisal Farooqui, 1999, founder and CEO of MouthShut.com 
 Lisa Rowe Fraustino, children's author, editor
 Norman Finkelstein, 1974, political scientist, professor
Margaux Fragoso, PhD 2009, memoirist
 Stewart D. Friedman, 1974, author and professor
 Steven Fulop, 1999, mayor of Jersey City, New Jersey
 Adam Gazzaley, 1990, Professor of Neurology, Physiology, and Psychiatry, UCSF
 Roger Lee Hall, 1972, composer and musicologist
 Monique Holsey-Hyman, 1986, social worker, professor, and politician
 Yasmin Hurd, 1982, Professor of Neuroscience, Icahn School of Medicine at Mount Sinai
 Sunny Hostin, 1990, co-host of The View and senior legal correspondent for ABC News 
 Vincent Ialenti, 2008, nuclear waste anthropologist, U.S. Department of Energy 
 Hakeem Jeffries, 1992, New York State Assembly, United States House of Representatives
 Mona Jhaveri, cancer researcher and entrepreneur focusing on biotech funding
 Bill T. Jones, dancer and Tony Award-winning choreographer
 Elaine D. Kaplan, 1976, Judge of the United States Court of Federal Claims
 Ellyn Kaschak, 1965, clinical psychologist, retired professor
 Jake Keegan, 2012, professional soccer player
 Nancy Becker-Kennedy - disability rights activist, writer, and actress
 Merle Keitel, 1980, psychologist, author and academic
 Andy Kindler, actor, comedian
 Leonard Klevan, businessman and chemist 
 Tony Kornheiser, 1970, sports commentator, finalist for the 1997 Pulitzer Prize for Commentary.
 Marc Lawrence, 1981, screenwriter and director
 Carol Leifer, stand-up comedian, actress, writer, and producer.
 Arnold J. Levine, 1961, molecular biologist, President of Rockefeller University
 Michael Lederer, 1981, author
 John Liu, 1988, 43rd New York City Comptroller
 Rebecca Leigh Longendyke, 2018, fashion model; earned a BS in biomedical engineering
 Donna Lupardo, MA 1983, New York State Assembly
 Geraldine MacDonald, 1968, MS 1973, Honorary Doctor of Letters 2017, businesswoman, technology executive
 John Mannion, BA Biology 1990, member of the New York State Senate
 Monica Martinez, 1999, member of the New York State Senate
 Stephanie McCurry, PhD 1988, Professor of History, Columbia University
 Ingrid Michaelson, 2001, musician
 Camille Paglia, 1968, critic, author, professor at University of the Arts
 Lee Ranaldo, 1978, musician, writer, artist, guitarist of Sonic Youth
 Paul Reiser, 1977, actor, comedian
 Liz Rosenberg, poet, writer
 Dave Rubin, 1998, comedian, talk show host
 Robert A. Rubinstein, PhD 1977, Distinguished Professor of Anthropology, Syracuse University
 Ruben Santiago-Hudson, 1978, Tony Award-winning actor and playwright 
 Vincent Schiraldi, juvenile justice reformer, policy expert, academic researcher
 Thomas Secunda, 1977, American business executive; co-founder/vice-chairman of Bloomberg L.P.
 Beverly J. Silver, PhD 1992, Professor and Chair of Sociology, Johns Hopkins University
 Karthik Sivakumar, Indian actor
 Art Spiegelman, 1995 Honorary Doctorate. Cartoonist and editor, creator of Maus, winner of a 1992 Pulitzer Prize (attended Harpur, never graduated)
 Bob Swan, MBA 1985, CEO of Intel
 Deborah Tannen, 1966, academic/writer on linguistics, discourse analysis, and interpersonal communication
 Alexander Vindman, 1998, a lieutenant colonel in the United States Army. Vindman was the first witness to appear in President Trump's impeachment probe over the Trump-Ukraine scandal. 
 David E. Wellbery, 1969, scholar, author
 Donald E. Westlake, novelist and screenwriter (did not graduate)
 John Wilson, 2008, documentary filmmaker
 Jeff Yass, billionaire co-founder of Susquehanna International Group
 Jillian York, 2004, journalist
 Arnie Zane, choreographer, dancer, co-founder of Bill T. Jones-Arnie Zane and Company

 Jay Walder, CEO of the  Metropolitan Transportation Authority of New York
 Hori Horibata, Member of the Philippines House of Representatives from Camarines Sur 1st District

In popular culture
To fans of the Americana-psychedelic-rock band The Grateful Dead, the name "Harpur College" specifically refers to a concert the band played at the college on May 2, 1970. The reverence in which this concert is held owes both to the performance and to the fact that high quality bootleg cassette recordings circulated widely among Deadheads for decades before the recording was officially released on CD as Dick's Picks Volume 8. According to Jimmy Cawley writing in the Boston Globe, "The Harpur College show has long been prized by tape collectors as an example of the depth the Dead were capable of on any given night."

References

External links

 
 Binghamton Athletics website

 
Binghamton, New York
SUNY university centers
Educational institutions established in 1946
Education in Broome County, New York
Tourist attractions in Binghamton, New York
Companies based in Binghamton, New York
Organizations based in Binghamton, New York
1946 establishments in New York (state)
Buildings and structures in Binghamton, New York
1965 establishments in New York (state)
Buildings and structures in Broome County, New York
Public universities and colleges in New York (state)